Sisterhood is a 2016 Macau-Hong Kong drama film directed by Tracy Choi and starring Gigi Leung, Fish Liew and Jennifer Yu. The film had its North American premiere at the Toronto LGBT Film Festival on 28 May 2017.

Premise
In the 1990s, Sei finds herself a job at a massage parlor in Macau and befriends Ling, an older woman who is a single mother.
On the eve of Macau's handover to China, they have a fight which sets them on separate paths: Sei moves to Taiwan to marry a guest house owner while Ling stays in Macau with her infant son. Fifteen years later, Sei, now in her late thirties, learns that Ling has died. She decides to return to Macau to revisit her past in a familiar yet very different Macau.

Cast
 Gigi Leung as Sei	  	
 Fish Liew as Teenage Sei 	  	
 Jennifer Yu as Ling	  	
 Lee Lee-zen as Chen Chung
 Kevin Chu as Teenage Chen Chung
 Stephanie Che as #38	
 Panther Chan as Teenage #38
 Teresa Mak as #44
 Eliz Lao as Teenage #44 	  	
 Elena Kong as Lai
 Dino Acconci as Massage parlor manager
 Louis Castro as Bakery boss	  	
 Terence Siufay as Restaurant owner
 Ai Wai

Soundtrack

Featured songs

Reception

Accolades

References

Further reading

External links

2016 films
2010s coming-of-age drama films
2016 LGBT-related films
Lesbian-related films
LGBT-related drama films
Cantonese-language films
Hong Kong drama films
Hong Kong LGBT-related films
Films set in Macau
Films set in Taiwan
Films shot in Macau
Films shot in Taiwan
Films shot in Hong Kong
2016 directorial debut films
2016 drama films
2010s Mandarin-language films
2010s Hong Kong films